Bělá is a village and administrative part of Mírová pod Kozákovem in Semily District in the Liberec Region of the Czech Republic. It used to be an independent municipality before the formation of Mírová pod Kozákovem. The village lies just next to Turnov.

History 
The village was first mentioned in 1322.

In Bělá, there is a school, firehouse, roadside cafe, village shop, fire suppression pond, and swimming pool shop.

Záholice 
The hamlet Záholice is a part of the municipal parts of Bělá and Rohliny. It is a basic settlement unit with 70 addresses registered in its territory. In 2011, 176 people lived here permanently.

References

External links 

Mírová pod Kozákovem